Helen Walker (1920–1968) was an American movie actress of the 1940s.

Helen Walker may also refer to:

 Helen M. Walker (1891–1983), statistician and educational researcher
 Helen Roberts (1912–2010), singer and actress, sometimes known as Helen Roberts Walker
 Helen J. Walker (1953–2017), UK space scientist
Dr. Helen Walker (previously Trent), a fictional character from the UK television series Heartbeat, see List of Heartbeat cast members